United Nations Security Council Resolution 303, adopted on December 6, 1971, after a lack of unanimity at the 1606th and 1607th meetings of the Council prevented it from exercising its primary responsibility, the Council decided to refer the question to the General Assembly.

Meetings at the Council were called following a deterioration in relations between India and Pakistan over a series of incidents, including Jammu and Kashmir, and the additional strife in East Pakistan. Additionally, the United Nations Military Observer Group in India and Pakistan reported violations on both sides of the Karachi Agreement of 1949.

The resolution was adopted by 11 votes to none, while France, the People's Republic of Poland, Soviet Union and United Kingdom abstained.

See also
 Bangladesh Liberation War
 Kashmir conflict
 List of United Nations Security Council Resolutions 301 to 400 (1971–1976)

References

External links
 
Text of the Resolution at undocs.org

 0303
History of Pakistan
 0303
December 1971 events